Madelen Fatimma Maria Janogy (born 12 November 1995) is a Swedish footballer who plays as a forward for Hammarby IF in the Swedish Damallsvenskan and for the Sweden national team.

Club career

Sweden
Janogy began her club career with hometown team Falköpings KIK in the second-tier Elitettan in 2010. She scored her first senior goal on 24 August 2011 in a 3–0 win over Sils IF.

In 2014, Janogy moved to Mallbackens IF and won the Elitettan title in her first season with the club. She spent a further two seasons with Mallbackens in the first division Damallsvenskan before securing a move to Piteå IF when Mallbackens were relegated at the end of the 2016 season. Janogy won the championship title with Piteå in 2018.

Wolfsburg
In December 2019, Janogy signed a one-and-a-half year contract with defending German Bundesliga champions Wolfsburg.

Hammarby IF
On 22 December 2020, Janogy moved to Hammarby IF, signing a two-year contract.

International career
Janogy made her senior Sweden debut on 22 January 2019, coming on as a 61st minute substitute in a goalless draw against South Africa. She scored her first international goal on 31 May 2019 in a 1–0 friendly win against South Korea. Janogy was part of the squad for the 2019 FIFA Women's World Cup, scoring in stoppage time against Chile after subbing on in the 81st minute to help secure a 2–0 win in Sweden's opening game of the tournament. She made three appearances at the 2019 World Cup, all from the bench.

International goals

Personal life
Janogy was born and raised in Falköping. Her mother is Swedish and her father is from Mali, making her the first player in Swedish national team history with African roots. Both Madelen and her twin sister, Victoria, are named after the princesses of the Swedish royal family.

Honours
Mallbackens IF
Elitettan: 2014

Piteå IF
Damallsvenskan: 2018

References

External links 
 
 
 

1995 births
Living people
Swedish women's footballers
Swedish people of Malian descent
Mallbackens IF players
Damallsvenskan players
Women's association football midfielders
Piteå IF (women) players
Hammarby Fotboll (women) players
2019 FIFA Women's World Cup players
Sweden women's international footballers
VfL Wolfsburg (women) players
Swedish expatriate sportspeople in Germany
Frauen-Bundesliga players
Footballers at the 2020 Summer Olympics
Olympic footballers of Sweden
People from Falköping Municipality
Olympic medalists in football
Medalists at the 2020 Summer Olympics
Olympic silver medalists for Sweden
Swedish twins
Twin sportspeople
Sportspeople from Västra Götaland County